Thomas Michael Dykers, Sr. (December 3, 1905 – June 13, 1975) was a submarine commander during World War II who reached the rank of Rear Admiral in the United States Navy. He was also a writer and Television producer. He produced and narrated the 1957–58 TV series The Silent Service.

Early life
Dykers was born in 1905 to Reginald and Phoebe Alberta Dykers (née Hall) in New Orleans, Louisiana. He began his education at Tulane University, where he became a member of Sigma Alpha Epsilon. The following year he transferred to The United States Naval Academy in Annapolis, Maryland , and graduated in 1927.

Junior Officer
After graduating from Annapolis, Dykers served onboard the USS Memphis. In 1930 Dykers had completed a course in chemical warfare, and was assigned to the USS Bulmer. In 1931 Dykers completed a submarine course in New London, Connecticut, and was subsequently assigned to the USS S-15 (SS-120). In 1934 Dykers completed a submarine commanders course while still being assigned to the USS S-15. In 1935 and 1936 Dykers was assigned to the Georgia School of Technology (now the Georgia Institute of Technology) R.O.T.C. and completed the Naval War College Correspondence Course. In 1937 Dykers was assigned to the USS S-25 (SS-130). In 1938 Dykers took command of the USS S-35 (SS-140).

World War II
Dykers took command of the USS Jack in 1942, as her first commanding officer, and subsequently sank eight Japanese ships and was highly decorated for his service.

Later career
In 1949 Rear Admiral Dykers retired from the Office of the Chief of Naval Operations and moved to California. There he became a technical advisor for the film industry, aiding in films such as The Flying Missile, Submarine Command, and Torpedo Alley.  He later produced and narrated the 1957–58 TV series The Silent Service.

References

United States Navy rear admirals (lower half)
1905 births
1975 deaths
People from New Orleans
United States Navy personnel of World War II
Recipients of the Navy Cross (United States)
Recipients of the Silver Star
Military personnel from Louisiana